The Nebraska Cornhuskers women's tennis team represents the University of Nebraska–Lincoln in the Big Ten Conference. The program was established in 1976 and has made the NCAA Championship six times since 2000, most recently in 2013. Fourteen Cornhuskers have won conference championships, and twenty have been named all-conference selections. The team has been coached by Scott Jacobson since 1992.

Coaches

Coaching history

Coaching staff

Conference champions

Honors and awards

Big Ten Player of the Year
Mary Weatherholt – 2012, 2013

Big Eight Freshman of the Year
Annie Yang – 1994
Lisa Hart – 1995

Big 12 Freshman of the Year
Kim Hartmann – 2006
Mary Weatherholt – 2009

Big 12 Coach of the Year
Scott Jacobson – 2005

Big Ten Coach of the Year
Scott Jacobson – 2012

All-Americans

Cari Groce – 1984 (Doubles)
Liz Mooney – 1984 (Doubles)
Mary Weatherholt – 2013 (Singles, Doubles)
Patricia Veresova – 2013 (Doubles)

First-team all-conference selections
First-team All-Big 12

'''First-team All-Big Ten
Mary Weatherholt – 2012, 2013
Patricia Veresova – 2013
Claire Reifeis  – 2019, 2020
Kristina Novak – 2021

Season-by-season results

Notes

References

College women's tennis in the United States